Sonia Opoku (born 25 December 2001) is a Ghanaian footballer ,who plays as a attacking midfielder for the Turkish club 1207 Antalya Spor, and the Ghana women's national team. She previously played for Ghanaian club Ampem Darkoa Ladies.

Club career 
Opoku started her career with Ampem Darkoa Ladies. In 2017, she suffered an injury that kept her out for close to three years until 2019 when she underwent surgery and recovery processes. She returned to playing in 2020 during the 2020–21 Ghana Women's Premier League season. Opoku played a key role in her return by helping Ampem Darkoa to a first place finish in the Northern Zone league and qualifying for the play-off final. Ampem Darko however lost the final to Hasaacas Ladies losing by 2–0. Opoku was adjudged the NASCO player of the match for her great performance even though her team lost.

In the Ghana Women's FA Cup, she also played a key role in getting Ampem-Darkoa to do final by scoring the winning goal in their semi-final fixture against Thunder Queens. She scored the goal in the 92nd minute of extra time after the match remained goalless at full time. In the FA Cup final, Ampem Darkoa lost the final again to Hasaacas Ladies by 2–0. Opoku was however adjudged the player of the season.

By March 2022, she moved to Turkey and signed with Trabzonspor to play in the second half of the 2021-22 Turkish Women's Super League season. In the {{2022-23 Turkish Women's Football Super League|next season]], she transferred to 1207 Antalya Spor.

International career 
Opoku was a member of the Ghana U-17 women's team from 2016 to 2018. En route to the 2016 FIFA U-17 Women's World Cup, she suffered an ACL injury during their final training camp session which ended her chances of featuring at the tournament. Due to the recurring nature of the injury she was kept out of featuring in the 2018 FIFA U-17 Women's World Cup after being part of the squad during the initial qualifiers.

Opoku earned her first senior national team call up in July 2021 ahead of the Aisha Buhari Cup and 2022 Africa Women Cup of Nations qualifiers against Nigeria. She made her international debut during an Aisha Buhari Cup friendly match against South African women's national team on 17 September 2021.

Personal life 
Sonia Opoku has a very similar personality and lifestyle like Neymar Jr of PSG. People often call her, Neymar Jr, because of a style of play.she’s a lovely person in and off the pitch

Honours 
Ampem Darkoa

 Ghana Women's Premier League: 2015–16, 2017, 2021–22
 Ghana Women's Super Cup: 2017
Individual

 Ghana Women's FA Cup Player of the Season: 2021

References 

Living people
Year of birth missing (living people)
Ghanaian women's footballers
Women's association football midfielders
Ampem Darkoa Ladies F.C. players
Ghana women's international footballers
Ghanaian expatriate sportspeople in Turkey
Expatriate women's footballers in Turkey
Turkish Women's Football Super League players
Trabzonspor women's players
1207 Antalya Spor players